Azar Key (also Romanized as Āzār Key) is a village in Rahimabad Rural District, Rahimabad District, Rudsar County, Gilan Province, Iran. At the 2006 census, its population was 345, in 75 families.

References 

Populated places in Rudsar County